Frozen Scream is a 1980 American horror film directed by Frank Roach, produced by Renee Harmon, and starring Harmon, Lynne Kocol and Thomas Gowan. Harmon also co-wrote the story with Doug Ferrin. The film achieved a degree of notoriety when it was released on video in the UK in 1983 and became one of the films on the government's video nasty list. The movie follows the story of two scientists whose experiments in unlocking the secrets of immortality result instead in the creation of black-robed zombies who must be preserved at very low temperatures to continue functioning.

Plot 
Academic scientists Lil Stanhope and Sven Johnsson are researching the secrets of immortality. Their project involves turning their subjects into zombies and storing them in walk-in freezers. Their collaborator, Tom Girard, refuses further participation and is apparently killed in his house by men in hooded robes who inject him with a serum. Ann, Tom's wife, arrives before the intruders can carry away his body.

Ann is hospitalized following what Lil calls "the incident in the hallway." She attempts to convince Ann that most of it was all in her head, although Ann insists she was drugged by the intruders and left unconscious. Lil says that the police found Tom's body but no evidence of hooded men or hypodermic needles.

Detective Kevin McGuire is assigned to the case, which he believes is connected to the disappearance of medical students Kirk Richard and Bob Russell. Kevin wants to interview Ann—sometime in the past, she had dumped him and married Tom the following day—but Lil prevents it. Sven suggests discharging Ann and appointing Cathrin  as her home nurse. Cathrin is in fact a zombie. Tom had told Ann of the immortality project, and they had attended a ceremony on a beach on Halloween. Tom left to confess to Father O'Brien while Ann watched the students chanting "love and immortality" around a bonfire.

At their lab, Lil tells Sven that they're "interfering with nature" and that "the beings we create are not human beings." Sven assures her that they'll soon unlock the secrets of immortality. Meanwhile, Kevin tells Ann of his suspicions about Sven and Lil. Ann agrees to report back what she finds.

Kevin and Ann interview Fr. O'Brien. He tells them that Tom had said Sven was using curare on rats, then reviving them and keeping them at low temperatures to retard their aging process. But after being revived, Tom said, the rats acted as if they were "almost soul-less." Shortly thereafter, a zombie strangles O'Brien.

Ann gets a phone call from Tom, who complains of feeling cold and numb. The call ends abruptly when intruders burst into Ann's house. She calls Kevin for help and rushes to Cathrin's room. But Cathrin isn't there. Instead, a zombie grabs Ann and threatens to kill her and Tom if she continues to cooperate with Kevin. Cathrin returns and denies that anyone was in the house. Not believing her, Kevin takes Ann home, where they sleep together. Kevin declares his love for her; she says nothing about her feelings toward him.

Ann searches Lil's office and discovers photos of the missing med students. She tells Kevin that she'll search Sven's home lab during his Halloween party. During the party, Cathrin overheats and drops dead.

The party continues. Ann sees Tom staring blankly from the window of an old house. She calls Kevin. Inside the house, she finds a freezer containing Tom and the missing students, both of whom are zombies. The zombies attack. Kevin kills one but is knocked over by a car and taken to the hospital. Ann is chased by the second zombie. Just as he is about to kill Ann, Lil appears and tells him that he's been out of the freezer for too long. He immediately dies.

Ann is taken to Sven's lab, where he intends to zombify her. But Lil kills him. Lil asks Ann to take Sven's place on the immortality project. As a ruse, Ann agrees, but then destroys the lab. An angry Lil decides to inject Ann with the zombie serum. O'Brien, himself a zombie, arrives.

Ann, Lil and O'Brien visit Kevin in the hospital. Ann, now a zombie, promises she'll love Kevin forever. But her eternal love has a price, which Kevin pays as Lil plunges a hypodermic of zombie serum into his eye.

Cast

Production 
Frozen Scream is one of two films made by Ciara Productions. The other was Hell Riders (1984), a biker movie set in a ghost town.

Some footage from Frozen Scream was re-used in Run Coyote Run (1987), which was also produced by, written by and starred Harmon. The film is a crime thriller about a psychic who is trying to find her dead sister's killers.

Release 
Frozen Scream was shot in 1975, but not shown to distributors until "sometime around 1980" and apparently failed to achieve a theatrical release. Its initial commercial release was on VHS in the UK in 1983 by Home Video Productions. In 1985, it was released for the first time in the US on a double-feature VHS tape with The Executioner Part II (1984). Because of the five-year gap between its filming and the date distributors got their first look at it, some sources give the movie's date as 1975 while others list 1980.

British film scholar Julian Petley lists the film as one of the 69 movies which were on the video nasties list "at one time or another." But it was not one of the 39 films prosecuted under the Obscene Publications Act 1959, which had been amended in 1983 to include films. According to British critic Neil Christopher, the film "officially (...) remains uncertified and unavailable" in the UK.

As Fred Beldin at Allmovie writes, Frozen Scream was "withdrawn from prosecution perhaps because the bluenoses were too confused by the film's constant flashbacks, dream sequences, and extraneous narration to focus on a few gratuitous axe murders and eye-gougings."

Critical reception 
Critics had little good to say about Frozen Scream. Its poor production values and voice-over narration were common themes, though. In The Zombie Movie Encyclopedia, academic Peter Dendle calls the film a "dismal and homely backyard effort" with "robotic acting, abrupt transitions, and annoying Wonder Years'-like voice-over narration." He also notes that "The zombies wear black hooded cloaks that associate them with a certain pre-Christian immortality cult and cheesy moustaches that associate them with the '70s."

Glenn Kay describes the movie as a "totally nonsensical" and "forgettable little oddity" that "may supply a few laughs to bad-movie fans." He says that the "inappropriate narration (...) would be more suited to an infomercial" and that "Every element is truly amateurish, from the wooden acting to the lousy photography to the terrible score and the hilariously bad band during a party scene."

Likewise, British critic Jamie Russell notes that Frozen Scream features "Hooded, frozen zombies [who] run amok in this cheesy 1970s outing." He points out that the "voiceover unhelpfully drown[s] out other characters' dialogue as they speak!" and concludes that the film is "Badly made, incompetently plotted; it's pretty dire."

According to David Elroy Goldweber, "Apparently, all the sound was dubbed after filming, but some dialogue made no sense, so an extra voice-over (...) was added to clarify things. Yet no original dialgue was cut, so the second dialogue simply overlaps the first." Glodweber finds the film to be a "desperate mishmash of anything the filmmakers thought might entertain the audience."

Beldin, the AllMovie reviewer, calls the film an "unintentionally surreal sci-fi horror yarn," and adds that "there's no doubt that Frozen Scream is a highly bizarre experience psychotronic devotees should enjoy enduring."

References

Sources

External links 
 

1980 films
1980 horror films
American zombie films
Video nasties
1980s English-language films
1980s American films